Hokus Pokus is a 1949 short subject directed by Jules White starring American slapstick comedy team The Three Stooges (Moe Howard, Larry Fine and Shemp Howard). It is the 115th entry in the series released by Columbia Pictures starring the comedians, who released 190 shorts for the studio between 1934 and 1959.

Plot
The Stooges are three paperhangers who also look after invalid Mary (Mary Ainslee), who always uses a wheelchair. The seemingly helpless blonde, however, is trying to swindle her insurance company out of $25,000, as she is not handicapped in the least. While the Stooges are at work hanging posters, they are taken by one poster that advertises a great hypnotist, Svengarlic ("He'll steal your breath away!" the poster announces). The Stooges want the hypnotist to work his magic on Mary so that she can walk again, but Svengarlic is more interested in winning an audience by hypnotizing the Stooges. Under his spell, they walk out onto a flagpole high on a building and dance. But a distracted bicyclist knocks Svengarlic over and the Stooges are abruptly awakened. They immediately panic when they see where they are, then the flagpole breaks, sending them flying through an open window. The boys land directly in the insurance office where Mary is about to be handed her check. Startled, she stands up to look at the boys, only to have her scheme exposed and her check snatched and torn up. Angry, she grabs the ball from the broken flagpole and throws it at the boys in the heads.

Cast

Credited
 Moe Howard as Moe
 Larry Fine as Larry
 Shemp Howard as Shemp
 Mary Ainslee as Mary
 Vernon Dent as Insurance adjuster
 Jimmy Lloyd as Cliff

Uncredited
 David Bond as Svengarlic
 Ned Glass as Svengarlic's manager
 Johnny Kascier as man on bicycle

Production notes
Hokus Pokus was filmed on March 23–26, 1948, and released over 13 months later on May 5, 1949. It was remade as Flagpole Jitters (1956), using ample stock footage. In particular, the two films have different endings: Mary is a fraud here, whereas in the later picture she is actually paraplegic. In the remake Svengarlic is the fraud.

The Stooges make a reference to Sing Sing Correctional Facility, in which Shemp believes he has hypnotized Moe into thinking he is locked up in the infamous prison. The character name 'Svengarlic' is a parody of 'Svengali,' the name of a fictional character in George du Maurier's 1894 novel Trilby.

References

External links
 
 

1949 films
The Three Stooges films
American black-and-white films
1949 comedy films
Films about hypnosis
Hokus Pokus
Films directed by Jules White
Columbia Pictures short films
American slapstick comedy films
1940s English-language films
1940s American films